Minuscule 787 (in the Gregory-Aland numbering), ε471 (von Soden), is a Greek minuscule manuscript of the New Testament written on parchment. Palaeographically it has been assigned to the 12th century. The manuscript has complex contents.

Description 
The codex contains the text of the four Gospels, on 305 parchment leaves (size ).

The text is written in one column per page, 24 lines per page.

There is also another division according to the smaller Ammonian Sections, but without references to the Eusebian Canons.

Lectionary markings at the margin, incipits,  (lessons), liturgical books with hagiographies, Synaxarion and Menologion were added by a later hand.

Text 
The Greek text of the codex is a representative of the Byzantine text-type. Hermann von Soden classified it to the textual family Iκ. Aland placed it in Category V.

According to the Claremont Profile Method it represent the textual family Π268 in Luke 1 and Luke 20. In Luke 20 no profile was made. It creates textual pair with minuscule 268.

History 
According to Gregory the manuscript was written in the 12th century. The manuscript is currently dated by the INTF to the 12th century.

Formerly it was housed in the monastery μεγαλων πυλων 23. The manuscript was noticed in catalogue from 1876.

It was added to the list of New Testament manuscripts by Gregory (787). Gregory saw the manuscript in 1886.

The manuscript is now housed at the National Library of Greece (108) in Athens.

See also 

 List of New Testament minuscules
 Biblical manuscript
 Textual criticism
 Minuscule 786

References

Further reading 

 

Greek New Testament minuscules
12th-century biblical manuscripts
Manuscripts of the National Library of Greece